Matthew Tonner is an American musician and music producer. 
Tonner is known as a member of Florida-based indie folk band The 502s, producing and performing multiple instruments on their debut album Because We Had To and follow up album Could It Get Better Than This.  He is a former member of the electronic pop duo Destima  and of Laney Jones and the Spirits. 
He is also known for his solo music under the mononym Tonner.

Biography
Tonner was born and raised in Shorewood, Wisconsin.  He received a degree in music from Rollins College, where he also met songwriting collaborator Laney Jones.   Tonner co-produced and performed on Laney Jones’ 2016 self-titled album, which received critical acclaim from Rolling Stone, Paste Magazine, Elmore Magazine  and The Lefort Report, the latter of which declared the album "easily one of the Best Albums of 2016".

In 2017, Tonner was recruited by The 502s to produce their full-length album “Because We Had To” and joined their live band shortly afterward. The album received critical acclaim from PopMatters and Cowboys and Indians. Also in 2017, Tonner produced the self-titled full length album for Orlando based folk band Beemo; the lead single from Beemo's album "Did For You" (which featured piano and arrangements from Tonner), later appeared in the 2021 film Red Rocket.

Tonner has continued as an active member of The 502s and produced their follow up album Could It Get Better Than This 

In 2020, Tonner began releasing music under his own name, culminating in the Whispers in the Dark EP.  His debut single “Criminal” was co-produced with Jordan Shih of the band SALES. 

In early 2022 Tonner released "Suspense", the first single from his upcoming new solo album.  In May 2022, Tonner released his next single "Volcano", a song inspired by climate change and the 2021 Gulf of Mexico fires.  "Volcano" received critical attention and praise for its melodic songwriting and production.  Another single "Castles" was released in July 2022  Tonner also announced the new album will be titled "Walls Come Down", to be released in fall 2022.

Discography

with Laney Jones

with The 502s

as Tonner

References 

1988 births
21st-century American singers
21st-century American writers
Living people
American male singer-songwriters
Singer-songwriters from Florida
Writers from Florida